Stenopterygia is a genus of moths of the family Noctuidae.

Species
 Stenopterygia calida (Walker, 1862)
 Stenopterygia firmivena Prout, 1927
 Stenopterygia gabonensis Laporte, 1974
 Stenopterygia kebea (Bethune-Baker, 1906)
 Stenopterygia khasiana (Hampson, 1894)
 Stenopterygia monostigma (Saalmüller, 1891)
 Stenopterygia nausoriensis Robinson, 1975
 Stenopterygia rufitincta Hampson, 1918
 Stenopterygia subcurva (Walker, 1857)
 Stenopterygia tenebrosa Hampson, 1908

References
Natural History Museum Lepidoptera genus database
Stenopterygia at funet

Hadeninae